Christiane Mercelis (born 5 October 1931) is a Belgian former tennis player active in the 1950s and 1960s.

In 1949, Mercelis won the Girls' Singles of the Wimbledon Championships. She competed every year at Wimbledon between 1951 and 1968, and at the French Open between 1952 and 1965. In the French Open, she reached the quarter-finals in 1957.

Mercelis played for Belgium in the Federation Cup from 1963 to 1964 and from 1966 to 1969, losing all five singles matches, and winning two of her eight doubles matches. She is the oldest player to have played for Belgium at 37 years 231 days in her last doubles match against South Africa on 24 May 1969, which she won partnering Michele Kahn.

In the Belgian Tennis Championships. she won 13 singles titles, 14 women's doubles titles, and 16 mixed doubles titles, of which 13 were partnering Jacky Brichant.

Titles
Mercelis won 17 singles and 17 doubles titles in official tournaments.

Singles
1956: Nice
1957: Cannes, Nice, Aix-en-Provence
1959: Cologne, Moscow, Brussels
1960: Brussels, Kent
1961: Cannes, Brussels, Knokke, Hilversum)
1963: Le Touquet
1964: Brussels, Knokke
1965: Brussels

Doubles
1955: Rome
1957: Nice, Antwerp
1960: Knokke, Gstaad
1961: Brussels, Antwerp, Amsterdam, Hilversum)
1962: Bremen, Cannes, Nice
1963: Ostend
1964: Knokke, Menton
1965: Knokke
1968: Ostend

References

External links
 
 
 

1931 births
Living people
Belgian female tennis players
Grand Slam (tennis) champions in girls' singles
Place of birth missing (living people)
Wimbledon junior champions
20th-century Belgian women